In Congolese popular music, the term libanga (Lingala; from kobwaka libanga, referring to how a child might try to attract attention) refers to a common form of patronage whereby musicians name or praise wealthy or powerful sponsors publicly as part of their performances. A libanga is usually inserted into a song through listing individual names between verses or between verses and chorus. They can be sung, spoken, or shouted depending on context. Sometimes they are included for the purposes of a particular performance, or included in a recording.

According to Bob White, it forms part of a "practice of commercialized praise singing" which emerged in Zaire in the 1970s and grew in importance in subsequent decades. He states that "[t]he phenomenon of libanga has become an integral part of contemporary popular music in Kinshasa, and it reflects not only musicians' urgent need for money but also the political culture of the Mobutu regime, which, through the mechanism of animation politique, customarily handed out financial and political resources in exchange for public displays of flattery and loyalty". 

Patronage remains central to the music industry in the Democratic Republic of the Congo, and it is difficult to make commercial music without it. The Economist observed that a libanga is "not done out of ideological conviction" and noted that one song by the musician Werrason names 110 people "many of whom would have paid for the privilege".

References

Bibliography

Lingala words and phrases
Democratic Republic of the Congo music
Society of the Democratic Republic of the Congo